is a Japanese professional 7 dan Go player.

Biography
Under the tutorage of Yoshiteru Abe, Kamagawa turned professional in 1975, and reached 2 dan in the same year. Kamagawa obtained the rank of 7 dan in 1991.

Notes

Japanese Go players
1955 births
Living people